The , currently known as the betPawa Premier League for sponsorship reasons, is the top professional association football division of the football league system in Ghana. Officially formed in 1956 to replace a previous league incarnation, the Gold Coast Club Competition (which began in 1933 and ended in 1953–54), the league is organized by the Ghana Football Association and was ranked as the 11th best league in Africa by the IFFHS from 2001 to 2010, and the league was also ranked 65th in the IFFHS' Best Leagues of the World ranking, in the 1st Decade of the 21st Century (2001–2010). on 4 February 2014. It has been dominated by Asante Kotoko and Hearts of Oak. The bottom 3 teams are relegated at the end of each season and placed in each zone of the Ghanaian Division One League.

The 2019–20 season was halted and eventually cancelled due to the COVID-19 pandemic in Ghana that mirrored the cause of postponement or cancellation of association football leagues and competitions across the globe.

Participating clubs (2022–23)

Previous winners

 1956: Hearts of Oak (Accra)
 1957: no winner
 1958: Hearts of Oak (Accra)
 1959: Asante Kotoko (Kumasi)
 1960: Eleven Wise (Sekondi-Takoradi)
 1961–62: Hearts of Oak (Accra)
 1962–63: Real Republicans (Accra)
 1963–64: Asante Kotoko (Kumasi)
 1964–65: Asante Kotoko (Kumasi)
 1966: Abandoned
 1967: Mysterious Dwarves (Cape Coast)
 1967–68: Asante Kotoko (Kumasi)
 1969: Asante Kotoko (Kumasi)
 1970: Great Olympics (Accra)
 1971: Hearts of Oak (Accra)
 1972: Asante Kotoko (Kumasi)
 1973: Hearts of Oak (Accra)
 1974: Great Olympics (Accra)
 1975: Asante Kotoko (Kumasi)
 1976: Hearts of Oak (Accra)
 1977: Sekondi Hasaacas (Sekondi)
 1978: Hearts of Oak (Accra)
 1979: Hearts of Oak (Accra)
 1980: Asante Kotoko (Kumasi)
 1981: Asante Kotoko (Kumasi)
 1982: Asante Kotoko (Kumasi)
 1983: Asante Kotoko (Kumasi)
 1984: Hearts of Oak (Accra)
 1985: Hearts of Oak (Accra)
 1986: Asante Kotoko (Kumasi)
 1987: Asante Kotoko (Kumasi)
 1988–89: Asante Kotoko (Kumasi)
 1989–90: Hearts of Oak (Accra)
 1990–91: Asante Kotoko (Kumasi)
 1991–92: Asante Kotoko (Kumasi)
 1992–93: Asante Kotoko (Kumasi)
 1993–94: Goldfields (Obuasi)
 1994–95: Goldfields (Obuasi)
 1995–96: Goldfields (Obuasi)
 1996–97: Hearts of Oak (Accra)
 1997–98: Hearts of Oak (Accra)
 1999: Hearts of Oak (Accra)
 2000: Hearts of Oak (Accra)
 2001: Hearts of Oak (Accra)
 2002: Hearts of Oak (Accra)
 2003: Asante Kotoko (Kumasi)
 2004–05: Hearts of Oak (Accra)
 2005: Asante Kotoko (Kumasi)
 2006–07: Hearts of Oak (Accra)
 2007–08: Asante Kotoko (Kumasi)
 2008–09: Hearts of Oak (Accra)
 2009–10: Aduana Stars (Dormaa)
 2010–11: Berekum Chelsea (Berekum)
 2011–12: Asante Kotoko (Kumasi)
 2012–13: Asante Kotoko (Kumasi)
 2013–14: Asante Kotoko (Kumasi)
 2015: Ashanti Gold (Obuasi)
 2016: Wa All Stars (Wa)
 2017: Aduana Stars (Dormaa)
 2018: Abandoned
 2019: Asante Kotoko (Kumasi)
 2019–20: Abandoned
 2020–21: Hearts of Oak (Accra)
 2021–22: Asante Kotoko (Kumasi)

List of Ghanaian football champions since 1956

Top scorers by season

Broadcasting rights 
In September 2013, SuperSport secured the television production and broadcast rights to the Ghana Premier League after signing a deal with the GFA. In 2017, Pay-TV provider and broadcaster StarTimes secured the official television production and broadcast rights holder for the league, broadcasting live matches per matchday on their branded decoders and equipment.

See also
 List of football clubs in Ghana
 Ghana Football Leagues
 Ghana Women's Premier League

Notes and references

Notes

References

External links
 Official website
 League at FIFA.com (archived)
 GhanaWeb Football News
 RSSSF final table archive

Ghana Premier League
Football leagues in Ghana
Top level football leagues in Africa
Sports leagues established in 1956
1956 establishments in Gold Coast (British colony)